Chen Xingdong (born 2 April 1970) is a Chinese former badminton player. He competed at the 1996 Summer Olympics in the mixed doubles event together with his partner Peng Xinyong. Chen was part of the Sichuan Sports Technology College team since 1984 and retired from the international tournament in 1997. In 1998, he was selected as a coach in Sichuan Province team and at the same year he join national team as a men's team coach. In early 2000, he focused as a mixed doubles coach.

His career in badminton started to appear in 1993 when he and his mixed doubles partner Sun Man won the gold medal at the 1993 East Asian Games, 1993 China Open, and 1994 Asian Championships. Chen qualified to compete at the 1994 World Cup with Gu Jun and finished as a runner-up. In 1995, he cooperated with Wang Xiaoyuan, won the mixed doubles title at the Swedish Open, and third place at the China Open.

In the middle of 1995, he teamed-up with Peng Xinyong. The duo became the champion at the 1995 Denmark and China Open, 1996 Polish Open, and qualified to compete at the 1996 Summer Olympics finished in the fourth place after lose a bronze medal match to Liu Jianjun and Sun Man in straight games 15–7, 4–15, 8–15. Chen two times helps the national mixed team clinched the Sudirman Cup in 1995 and 1997. He reached a career high as world No. 3 in June 1996 together with Peng.

Achievements

World Cup 
Mixed doubles

Asian Championships 
Mixed doubles

East Asian Games 
Mixed doubles

IBF World Grand Prix 
The World Badminton Grand Prix sanctioned by International Badminton Federation (IBF) since 1983.

Mixed doubles

References

External links
 
 
 
 

1970 births
Living people
Badminton players from Sichuan
Chinese male badminton players
Badminton players at the 1996 Summer Olympics
Olympic badminton players of China
Badminton players at the 1994 Asian Games
Asian Games bronze medalists for China
Asian Games medalists in badminton
Medalists at the 1994 Asian Games
Chinese badminton coaches
21st-century Chinese people
20th-century Chinese people